This is a list of defunct airlines of Libya.

See also

 List of airlines of Libya
 List of airports in Libya

References

Libya
Airlines
Airlines, defunct